Yasuaki Ninomiya is a Japanese aircraft designer. He is the creator of the "WhiteWings" line of paperboard aircraft, described as "the Ferraris of paper airplanes" by a curator of the National Air and Space Museum. He created paper airplanes since childhood and on Christmas Eve, 1966 learned that he could enter his designs in the First Great International Paper Airplane Contest. Pan American Airways offered to fly designs of paper airplanes that originated in Japan to the contest. He entered and, out of 12,000 entries from 28 countries, won in two categories: duration and distance.

His designs have sold millions throughout Japan and the world. He is the author of a multi-volume work on high-performance paper aircraft.

He has a number of patents on aircraft design.

References 

Japanese engineers
Year of birth missing (living people)
Living people